Vincent Grier (born March 14, 1983) is an American former college basketball player for the University of Minnesota Golden Gophers. He has scored 1,118 points, but did not play during his junior season, due to an injury.

He played for Minnesota after transferring from the University of North Carolina at Charlotte in 2003.
He led the Gophers in scoring for two consecutive seasons, including a trip to the NCAA Tournament that resulted in a first-round loss to Iowa State. He was signed by the 2006 NBA champions Miami Heat.

Since graduating from Minnesota, Grier has played professionally in Europe. He was signed by French club Cholet Basket for the 2008–09 season. Previously, he had played for BCM Gravelines.

Notes

External links
NBA.com player profile
Player profile

1983 births
Living people
American expatriate basketball people in the Dominican Republic
American expatriate basketball people in France
American expatriate basketball people in Jordan
American expatriate basketball people in Turkey
American men's basketball players
Applied Science University basketball players
BCM Gravelines players
BC Orchies players
Charlotte 49ers men's basketball players
Cholet Basket players
Mersin Büyükşehir Belediyesi S.K. players
Minnesota Golden Gophers men's basketball players
Sioux Falls Skyforce players
Universiade gold medalists for the United States
Universiade medalists in basketball
Small forwards
Shooting guards
Medalists at the 2005 Summer Universiade